Bad Widow is the second and last full-length album by the German hard rock band Cacumen. It was released in 1983 on the independent label Boom Records.  Cacumen would rename themselves Bonfire in 1986.  In 2002/2003, Claus Lessmann and Hans Ziller purchased the rights to the Cacumen material and re-released the collection under the Bonfire name individually as well as a box set called The Early Days.

Track listing

Band members
Claus Lessmann - lead vocals
Hans Ziller - lead & rhythm guitar, talkbox
Horst Maier - lead & rhythm guitar
Robert Prskalowicz - bass
Hans Forstner - drums

Covers
In 1990, the German band Number Nine did a cover version of "You Are My Destiny" for their Everybody's Crazy album.  The title was plainly called "Destiny".

References
 Billboard.com - Discography - Cacumen - Bad Widow

Bonfire (band) albums
1983 albums